K278 or K-278 may refer to:

K-278 (Kansas highway), a state highway in Kansas
Soviet submarine K-278 Komsomolets, a former Soviet Union submarine